General elections were held in Liechtenstein on 31 January and 2 February 1986. The result was a victory for the Patriotic Union, which won 8 of the 15 seats in the Landtag. The Progressive Citizens' Party won seven seats, whilst the new Free List narrowly failed to cross the 8% electoral threshold and did not obtain representation. The coalition government of the FBP and the VU continued.

They were the first elections in which women could vote, as until the passing of a referendum in 1984, suffrage had been limited to men. Emma Eigenmann was the only woman elected, becoming the first female member of the Landtag.

Results

References

Liechtenstein
1986 in Liechtenstein
Elections in Liechtenstein
January 1986 events in Europe
February 1986 events in Europe